Saltivka is a large residential area located in the northeastern region of Kharkiv in eastern Ukraine. It covers most of the eponymous Saltivskyi District with parts extending into the Kyivskyi District and Nemyshlyanskyi District. It is sometimes called the Saltivskyi Masyv, as it realizes a soviet urban planning concept which consist of several different neighborhoods with similar architectural design. Despite its reputation as a deprived residential area with outdated and dilapidated housing, more than a third of Kharkiv's total population resides within its boundaries. According to various estimates, some 400–800,000 people used to live there, making it one of the largest residential areas in Ukraine.

The name of the neighborhood is derived from the road that leads to Staryi Saltiv and Verkhnii Saltiv in Chuhuiv Raion.

The exact borders of the area aren't well defined, traditionally it refers to a part of the city located between the Kharkiv river and its tributary , though some might exclude from it the areas not covered by soviet tower blocks. Prior to the 1960s, Saltivka was called Saltivsky village, and consisted of a few small scattered areas with three-story buildings (Tyurinka, Stara Saltivka, Shevchenky, Selyshche imeni Kirova).

Saltivka was conceived from the start as a purely residential neighborhood according to the Soviet concept of creating so-called sleeping districts in large industrial cities. Saltivka has almost no industrial compounds, but there are many shops and markets for residents. The neighborhood includes one of the largest warehouse markets in Ukraine near the Akademika Barabashova station of the Kharkiv metro. The Barabashov marketplace, according to some sources, is the largest in Europe.

Residential development was initiated by the Dipromisto Institute in 1963. Saltivka's residential panel buildings typically have 9, 12 and 16 floors, and more rarely, 5 floors. Separate high-rise buildings were constructed from 1967, and construction on the bulk of the buildings in Saltivka began in the 1970s. Few new buildings building have been added since the 1990s, mostly near the Studentska and Heroiv Pratsi metro stations.

Saltivka was heavily damaged during the 2022 Russian invasion of Ukraine.

Attractions

 Zhuravlivskyi Hidropark, a recreational space on the Kharkiv river. 
 Victory Park - founded in honor of the 40th anniversary of Victory Day in 1985.  
 Cinemas "Dafi", "Kinoland", "Poznan"
 Monuments - Unit of Lt. Shyronin at the intersection of Yuvileinyi Prospect and Hvardiytsiv-Shyronintsiv Street, Lomonosov Monument (Traktorobudivnyky Prospect). 
 Sports: home field of American football team "Texas"
 Exhibition Center "Radmir", near metro station "Akademika Pavlova".

Saltivka is linked to the city center by the second line of Kharkiv Metro, called Saltivska. Four of the subway lines stations are located in the Saltivka neighborhood, along with its depot. The area is additionally served by four lines of the Kharkiv tram system. One the cities two tram depots is also located in the area, it was once the largest in the former Soviet Union, with an area of 20.8 hectares, however it was almost completely destroyed by russian artillery bombardment.

There are also many trolley, bus, and marshrutka (mini bus) stations and lines that serve the area.

Gallery

See also
 Borshchahivka

References

Neighborhoods of Kharkiv
Moskovskyi District
Kyivskyi District (Kharkiv)
Nemyshlyanskyi District